Kazan is a village in the Yüksekova District of Hakkâri Province in Turkey. The village had a population of 433 in 2022.

A flood hit the village in August 2017 causing damage to homes, vineyards, clover and wheat fields in the village.

Population 
Population history of the village from 2007 to 2022:

References 

Villages in Yüksekova District
Kurdish settlements in Hakkâri Province